Ride the Skies is the second studio album by noise rock band Lightning Bolt.

The second track, "Saint Jacques," is named after bassist Dan St. Jacques, a friend of the band and member of the bands Olneyville Sound System, Vincebus Eruptum (former), and Landed, the latter of which both Brian Gibson and Brian Chippendale are former members. Scandinavian free jazz power trio The Thing recorded a cover of track #4,  "Ride the Sky".  The cover is on their 2006 CD Action Jazz, released on the Norwegian label Smalltown Superjazzz.

Track listing

Album personnel
Brian Chippendale – drums and vocals
Brian Gibson – bass guitar
Dave Auchenbach – recording engineer
Jeff Lipton – mastering

References

External links 
 
 Lightning Bolt at Load Records

Further reading 

 

Lightning Bolt (band) albums
2001 albums
Load Records albums